Powerbirds is an American animated children's television series created by Stephen P. Breen and co-created by Jennifer Monier-Williams. The series premiered on January 19, 2020, on Universal Kids. The series is produced by Brown Bag Films.

Premise 
The series follows Max with his pet parakeets, Ace and Polly. Max counts on them to keep saving the day while he is away. The powerbirds save the city from danger and they stop the main villains: Nibbles, Clawdette, Scrapper, Minerva, and Asher Stasher from the events where Max will be going later, so then later, Max is excited to visit the events.

Characters

Main 
 Ace (voice of Cory Doran) is a yellow parakeet, who can turn into a superhero when trouble calls. He is determined, daring, and playful. When he is not fighting bad guys, he loves everything related to superheroes, and he is a food-loving bird.
 Polly (voice of Tara Strong) is a blue parakeet, who can also turn into a superhero like Ace. She is a very silly and creative bird, and can think outside of the box to solve problems. She has extra powers like super stretching herself that Ace does not have.

Supporting 
 Max (voice of Orlando Lucas) is an imaginative eight-year-old, who owns Polly and Ace. He loves comic books that are about superheroes and counts on Ace and Polly to make sure no danger is around the city when he is away, despite him not seeing them saving the day like the other humans can.
 Gwen (voice of Ana Sani) is Max’s little sister, who sometimes plays with him before they both leave to wherever they are going and would usually play as another character in his superhero games.
 Mrs. Lopez (voice of Paloma Nuñez) is a bookmobile driver who speaks in a Hispanic accent.
 Grandpa Felix (voice of Deven Mack) is Max’s grandfather, who would appear in some episodes prior to the mission and the lesson one of the Powerbirds must remember. These episodes are “Time to Dino-soar”, “The Powerbirds Pretender”, “Midnight Scrap”, “Wacky Wokka Walk”, and “Scrapper’s Magnet Mayhem”.

Villans 
 Nibbles (voice of Rob Tinkler) is a poodle dog, who tries to gain attention to become famous, but ends up causing disasters, mostly because he only thinks of himself and does not know why the famous people are loved. He speaks in a British accent.
 Clawdette (voice of Evany Rosen) is Max’s pet tabby cat and the Powerbirds’ adoptive sister. She believes that she is the best ninja, so she tries to get stuff so she can be the best at it. In "Power Meower Saves the Day", she actually helped Polly and Ace by wearing out Asher Stasher, and she helps them again in "Food Caper", when Scrapper was stealing the cat food for himself to eat. 
 Scrapper (voice of Tyler Muree) is a striped raccoon, who likes to try to steal all other people's food, especially his favorite, pizzas. He seems to be the least villainous of them because all he wants is food. He speaks in a New York accent.
 Minerva (voice of Shannon Hamilton) is an owl, who uses different tools to cause trouble such as bad dream bubbles, magic mirrors, consoles, and more to make herself smarter than the humans are. 
 Asher Stasher (voice of Cory Doran) is a flying squirrel, who tries to collect stuff for his "collection of shiny things", but sometimes wants stuff that is too big and decides that he either does not want it anyway or gets interrupted by a phone call from his mom.

Episodes 
The series has been picked up for 20 22-minute episodes. It premiered early on its original network for its first look of the show on January 1, 2020.

Production 
Universal Pictures has chosen to make a TV series out of Breen's children's books, which are published by Penguin, include Stick, Violet the Pilot, Pug and Doug, Unicorn Executions and Skyhorse, and the choice was Powerbirds. Universal Kids planned the series in 2017, but with a different style, before Sprout’s rebrand to Universal Kids, a different style of the characters, which was Max, Polly, Ace and another character, the Golden Eagle.

9 Story Media Group's live-action and animation division co-produced the series with animators from Brown Bag Films.

Reception 
Universal Kids stated Hollywood Life that "The series promotes underlying positive messages that we can all be our own superhero if we do the right thing.”

Release 
In 2017, Universal Kids, as Sprout, set a release date for Powerbirds in 2019, but on December 11, 2019, the show was delayed to a 2020 release date instead to January 19, 2020, and the show got a first look release on January 1, 2020. The show will also air on Family Jr. in Canada.

References 

2020 American television series debuts
2020s American animated television series
2020s American children's television series
American children's animated action television series
American children's animated adventure television series
American children's animated superhero television series
American flash animated television series
American preschool education television series
Animated preschool education television series
2020s preschool education television series
Animated television series about birds
Animated television series about children
Universal Kids original programming
English-language television shows